Daniel Steven Peña Sr. (born August 10, 1945) is an American businessman.

Early life
Peña is Mexican American and was raised in East Los Angeles, California. In 1971, he graduated from San Fernando Valley State College School of Business Administration and Economics with a Bachelor of Science degree in Business Administration.

Career
Peña began his career as a financial analyst on Wall Street. He went on to become president of Great Western Resources, Inc., a Houston-based oil company listed on the London Stock Exchange in 1984. In a move backed by shareholders, Peña was ousted as president of the company in 1992 and subsequently awarded $3.3 million by an American jury, for suing the company over his dismissal.

In 1984, Peña bought Guthrie Castle in Angus, Scotland from which he has operated several businesses.

In 2017, the castle and estate manager employed by Peña at Guthrie Castle was found to have committed fraud by double or triple booking wedding facilities and paying the higher charges into their own account. Peña said he forgave the employee and covered the £130,000 stolen from clients.

References

External links

American financiers
American investors
California State University, Northridge alumni
1945 births
Living people
American motivational speakers
Life coaches
21st-century American businesspeople
American expatriates in Scotland
American people of Mexican descent